The year 1953 in film involved some significant events.

Top-grossing films (U.S.)

The top ten 1953 released films by box office gross in North America are as follows:

Events
 January 16 – A new Warner Bros. Pictures Inc. is incorporated following a Consent Judgment to divest their Stanley Warner Theaters.
 February 5 – Walt Disney's production of J.M. Barrie's Peter Pan, starring Bobby Driscoll and Kathryn Beaumont, premieres to astounding acclaim from critics and audiences and quickly becomes one of the most beloved Disney films. This is the last Disney animated movie released in partnership RKO Pictures, becoming the last ever smash hit movie of the later company before it bankrupted in 1959.
 July 1 – Stalag 17, directed by Billy Wilder and starring William Holden, premieres and is considered by the critics and audiences to be one of the greatest WWII Prisoner of War films ever made. Holden wins the Academy Award for Best Actor for his performance in the film.
 August 5 – Fred Zinnemann's romantic and war masterpiece From Here to Eternity, starring Burt Lancaster, Montgomery Clift, Deborah Kerr, Frank Sinatra, and Donna Reed, premieres.
 August 27 – William Wyler's immortal romantic tale of Roman Holiday, starring Gregory Peck and Audrey Hepburn, premieres and propels Hepburn to super stardom.
 September 16 – Religious epic The Robe, starring Richard Burton and Jean Simmons, debuts as the first widescreen anamorphic film in cinema history, filmed in CinemaScope grossing a record $36,000 for a single theatre in its first day. It went on to gross a record (for a single theater) $264,428 in its first week.
 November 21 – Monogram Pictures, which had stopped releasing pictures under that banner from the start of the year, changes its name to Allied Artists Pictures Corporation.

Awards

Notable films released in 1953
United States unless stated

#

99 River Street, starring John Payne and Evelyn Keyes
The 5,000 Fingers of Dr. T, starring Tommy Rettig, screenplay by Dr. Seuss

A
Abbott and Costello Go to Mars
Abbott and Costello Meet Dr. Jekyll and Mr. Hyde
Act of Love (Un acte d'amour), starring Kirk Douglas – (US/France)
The Actress, starring Spencer Tracy and Jean Simmons
Albert R.N., directed by Lewis Gilbert, starring Anthony Steel, Jack Warner, Robert Beatty, William Sylvester – (GB)
The All-American, starring Tony Curtis
All I Desire, starring Barbara Stanwyck
All the Brothers Were Valiant, starring Ann Blyth
Anarkali – (India)
Appointment in Honduras, directed by Jacques Tourneur, starring Ann Sheridan and Glenn Ford
Arrowhead, starring Charlton Heston and Jack Palance

B
Baaz, directed by and starring Guru Dutt – (India)
The Band Wagon, starring Fred Astaire, Cyd Charisse, Jack Buchanan, Nanette Fabray, Oscar Levant
The Bandit of Brazil (O Cangaceiro) – (Brazil)
Barabbas, directed by Alf Sjöberg – (Sweden)
The Beast from 20,000 Fathoms, starring Paula Raymond and Cecil Kellaway
Beat the Devil, directed by John Huston, starring Humphrey Bogart, Jennifer Jones, Gina Lollobrigida – (Italy/GB/US)
The Beggar's Opera, starring Laurence Olivier and Dorothy Tutin – (GB)
Belinsky – (U.S.S.R.)
Ben and Me, featuring the voices of Sterling Holloway and Charles Ruggles
Beneath the 12-Mile Reef, starring Robert Wagner
Bienvenido Mr. Marshall, directed by Luis García Berlanga, starring Fernando Rey – (Spain)
The Big Heat, directed by Fritz Lang, starring Glenn Ford, Gloria Grahame, Lee Marvin
Big Leaguer, starring Edward G. Robinson
The Bigamist, directed by and starring Ida Lupino, with Joan Fontaine, Edmond O'Brien
 Black Ermine – (Argentina)
Blowing Wild, starring Gary Cooper and Barbara Stanwyck
The Blue Gardenia, starring Anne Baxter and Raymond Burr
A Blueprint for Murder, starring Joseph Cotten and Jean Peters
Bread, Love and Dreams (Pane, amore e fantasia), starring Vittorio De Sica and Gina Lollobrigida – (Italy)
Bright Road, the first feature-film appearance of Harry Belafonte (US)
The Brute (El Bruto), directed by Luis Buñuel, starring Pedro Armendáriz and Katy Jurado – (Mexico)
By the Light of the Silvery Moon, starring Doris Day and Gordon MacRae

C
The Caddy, starring Dean Martin and Jerry Lewis
Calamity Jane, starring Doris Day
Call Me Madam, starring Ethel Merman
The Captain's Paradise, starring Alec Guinness – (GB)
Cease Fire
The Charge at Feather River, starring Guy Madison
City Beneath the Sea, starring Robert Ryan, Anthony Quinn, Mala Powers
City That Never Sleeps, starring Gig Young, William Talman, Paula Raymond, Mala Powers
The Clown, starring Red Skelton
Confidentially Connie, starring Van Johnson and Janet Leigh
The Conquest of Everest – (documentary) – (GB)
The Cruel Sea, starring Jack Hawkins and Denholm Elliott – (GB)
Cry of the Hunted, starring Vittorio Gassman, Barry Sullivan, Polly Bergen

D
Dangerous Crossing, starring Jeanne Crain and Michael Rennie
Dangerous When Wet, starring Esther Williams
Decameron Nights, starring Joan Fontaine and Louis Jourdan
The Desert Rats, starring Richard Burton and James Mason
Desperate Moment, starring Dirk Bogarde and Mai Zetterling – (GB)
Devdas – (India)
Do Bigha Zamin (Two Acres of Land), directed by Bimal Roy – (India)
Donovan's Brain, starring Lew Ayres and Nancy Davis
Down Among the Sheltering Palms, starring Mitzi Gaynor, Gloria DeHaven, Jane Greer
Dream Wife, starring Cary Grant and Deborah Kerr

E
Él (Him), directed by Luis Buñuel, starring Arturo de Córdova – (Mexico)
The Earrings of Madame de..., directed by Max Ophüls, starring Charles Boyer – (France/Italy)
East of Sumatra, starring Anthony Quinn and Jeff Chandler
Easy to Love, starring Esther Williams
Easy Years (Anni facili), directed by Luigi Zampa – (Italy)
The Eddie Cantor Story, starring Keefe Brasselle
Entotsu no mieru basho (The Four Chimneys) – (Japan)
Esa pareja feliz (That Happy Couple), directed by Juan Antonio Bardem and Luis García Berlanga – (Spain)
Escape By Night, starring Bonar Colleano and Sid James – (GB)
Escape from Fort Bravo, directed by John Sturges, starring William Holden, Eleanor Parker, John Forsythe

F
Fair Wind to Java, starring Fred MacMurray and Vera Ralston
The Farmer Takes a Wife, starring Betty Grable
Fast Company, starring Howard Keel and Polly Bergen
Fear and Desire, directed by Stanley Kubrick
The Final Test, directed by Anthony Asquith, starring Jack Warner (GB)
Folly to Be Wise, directed by Frank Launder, starring Alastair Sim – (GB)
Footpath, starring Dilip Kumar – (India)
From Here to Eternity, directed by Fred Zinnemann, starring Burt Lancaster, Montgomery Clift, Deborah Kerr, Frank Sinatra,  Donna Reed – winner of 8 Oscars

G
Gate of Hell (Jigokumon) – (Japan)
A Geisha (Gion Bayashi), directed by Kenji Mizoguchi – (Japan)
Genevieve, starring Dinah Sheridan, John Gregson, Kay Kendall – (GB)
Gentlemen Prefer Blondes, directed by Howard Hawks, starring Jane Russell and Marilyn Monroe
The Girl Next Door, starring June Haver and Dan Dailey
The Girl Who Had Everything, starring Elizabeth Taylor, William Powell, Fernando Lamas, Gig Young
Give a Girl a Break, directed by Stanley Donen, starring Debbie Reynolds, Marge Champion, Gower Champion
The Glass Wall, starring Vittorio Gassman and Gloria Grahame
The Golden Blade, starring Rock Hudson and Piper Laurie
The Great Adventure (Det stora äventyret), directed by Arne Sucksdorff – (Sweden)
The Great Sioux Uprising, starring Jeff Chandler
Gun Fury, starring Rock Hudson and Donna Reed

H
The Heart of the Matter, starring Trevor Howard – (GB)
The Hitch-Hiker, directed by Ida Lupino, starring Edmond O'Brien and William Talman
Hondo, starring John Wayne and Geraldine Page in her film debut
Houdini, starring (husband and wife) Tony Curtis and Janet Leigh
House of Wax, starring Vincent Price
How to Marry a Millionaire, starring Marilyn Monroe, Betty Grable, Lauren Bacall (Grable, Fox's top star of the 1940s, with Monroe, Fox's top star of the 1950s)

I
I Confess, directed by Alfred Hitchcock, starring Montgomery Clift and Anne Baxter
The I Don't Care Girl, starring Mitzi Gaynor
I Love Lucy, starring Lucille Ball and Desi Arnaz
I, the Jury, starring Biff Elliot and Peggie Castle
Inferno, starring Robert Ryan
Interim, directed by Stan Brakhage, short film (25 ½ minutes); music by James Tenney)
The Intruder, starring Jack Hawkins – (GB)
Is Your Honeymoon Really Necessary?, starring Bonar Colleano and Diana Dors – (GB)
Island in the Sky, starring John Wayne
It Came from Outer Space, directed by Jack Arnold, starring Richard Carlson

J
Jennifer, starring Ida Lupino and Howard Duff
Jeopardy, starring Barbara Stanwyck, Barry Sullivan, Ralph Meeker
Julius Caesar, directed by Joseph L. Mankiewicz, starring Marlon Brando, James Mason, John Gielgud, Louis Calhern, Greer Garson,  Deborah Kerr

K
The Kidnappers, starring Jon Whiteley – (GB)
King of the Khyber Rifles, starring Tyrone Power
Kiss Me Kate, starring Kathryn Grayson, Howard Keel, Ann Miller, released in 2-D and 3-D

L
The Lady Without Camelias (La signora senza camelie), directed by Michelangelo Antonioni – (Italy)
The Landowner's Daughter (Sinhá Moça), starring Anselmo Duarte – (Brazil)
Lagu Kenangan, starring Titien Sumarni and AN Alcaff (Indonesia)
Latin Lovers, starring Lana Turner
Law and Order, a western starring Ronald Reagan
The Lawless Breed, starring Rock Hudson
Lili, starring Leslie Caron
The Limping Man, starring Lloyd Bridges – (GB)
A Lion Is in the Streets, starring James Cagney, Barbara Hale, Anne Francis
Little Boy Lost, starring Bing Crosby
Little Fugitive
The Living Desert, winner of Academy Award for Best Documentary Feature
Love in the City (L'Amore in Città), an anthology film directed by Michelangelo Antonioni, Dino Risi, Federico Fellini and others – (Italy)
Love Letter (Koibumi) – (Japan)

M
Malta Story, directed by Brian Desmond Hurst, starring Alec Guinness, Jack Hawkins, Anthony Steel, Muriel Pavlow – (GB)
Man in the Attic, starring Jack Palance and Constance Smith
The Man Between, starring James Mason and Claire Bloom – (GB)
Man in the Dark, starring Edmond O'Brien and Audrey Totter
Man on a Tightrope, starring Fredric March and Gloria Grahame
Martin Luther – (US/West Germany)
The Master of Ballantrae, directed by William Keighley, starring Errol Flynn, Roger Livesey, Anthony Steel, Beatrice Campbell – (U.K.)
Meet Me at the Fair, starring Dan Dailey and Diana Lynn
Miss Sadie Thompson, starring Rita Hayworth
The Mississippi Gambler, starring Tyrone Power and Piper Laurie
Mogambo, starring Clark Gable, Ava Gardner, Grace Kelly (remake of 1932's Red Dust which starred Gable with Jean Harlow)
Money from Home, starring Dean Martin and Jerry Lewis
Monsieur Hulot's Holiday (Les Vacances de Monsieur Hulot), directed by and starring Jacques Tati – (France)
La montaña sin ley
The Moon Is Blue, first U.S. movie to use the words "pregnant" and "virgin", directed by Otto Preminger, starring William Holden, David Niven, Maggie McNamara
The Moonlighter, starring Barbara Stanwyck and Fred MacMurray

N
The Naked Spur, starring James Stewart, Robert Ryan and Janet Leigh
The Net, directed by Anthony Asquith – (GB)
Niagara, starring Marilyn Monroe and Joseph Cotten
No Way Back (Weg Ohne Umkehr) – (West Germany)

P
Patita, starring Dev Anand and Usha Kiran – (India)
Peter Pan, a Walt Disney animation featuring the voice of Bobby Driscoll
The Phantom Stockman, starring Chips Rafferty – (Australia)
Pickup on South Street, directed by Sam Fuller, starring Richard Widmark, Jean Peters, Thelma Ritter
Plunder of the Sun, starring Glenn Ford
Pony Express, starring Charlton Heston (as Buffalo Bill)
The President's Lady (Charlton Heston's first turn at Andrew Jackson before The Buccaneer)

R
Remains to Be Seen, starring June Allyson and Van Johnson
Report News (Reportaje), starring Arturo de Córdova and Dolores del Río – (Mexico)
Return to Paradise, starring Gary Cooper
Ride, Vaquero!, starring Robert Taylor and Ava Gardner
The Robe, the first movie filmed in CinemaScope, starring Richard Burton and Jean Simmons
Rogue's March, starring Peter Lawford, Janice Rule
Roman Holiday, directed by William Wyler, starring Gregory Peck and Audrey Hepburn in her Oscar-winning first leading role
Rosanna (La Red) – (Mexico)

S
Salome, starring Rita Hayworth
Sawdust and Tinsel (Gycklarnas afton), directed by Ingmar Bergman – (Sweden)
Scared Stiff, starring Dean Martin, Jerry Lewis, Lizabeth Scott and Carmen Miranda
Sea Devils, starring Rock Hudson and Yvonne De Carlo – (GB/US)
Seminole, starring Rock Hudson and Anthony Quinn
Shane, directed by George Stevens, starring Alan Ladd, Jean Arthur (in her final film role), Brandon deWilde, Ben Johnson, Jack Palance
Siamo Donne (We, the Women), starring Alida Valli and Ingrid Bergman – (Italy)
Small Town Girl, starring Jane Powell and Ann Miller
So Big, directed by Robert Wise, starring Jane Wyman, Sterling Hayden, Steve Forrest
So This Is Love, starring Kathryn Grayson and Merv Griffin
South Sea Woman, starring Burt Lancaster and Virginia Mayo
Split Second, starring Alexis Smith and Jan Sterling
Stalag 17, directed by Billy Wilder, starring William Holden (in his Oscar-winning role), Don Taylor, Harvey Lembeck, Robert Strauss, Otto Preminger, Peter Graves
Stars of the Russian Ballet (Mastera russkogo baleta), starring Galina Ulanova – (USSR)
The State Department Store (Állami Áruház) – (Hungary)
The Steel Lady, starring Rod Cameron and Tab Hunter
The Story of Gilbert and Sullivan, starring Robert Morley and Maurice Evans – (GB)
The Story of Little Muck (Die Geschichte vom kleinen Muck) – (East Germany)
The Story of Three Loves, trilogy starring James Mason, Leslie Caron, Kirk Douglas
Summer with Monika (Sommaren med Monika), directed by Ingmar Bergman, starring Harriet Andersson – (Sweden)
The Sun Shines Bright, directed by John Ford, starring Charles Winninger

T
Take Me to Town, directed by Douglas Sirk, starring Ann Sheridan and Sterling Hayden
Take the High Ground!, starring Richard Widmark and Karl Malden
Thérèse Raquin, directed by Marcel Carné, starring Simone Signoret – (France)
Three Perfect Wives (Las Tres perfectas casadas), starring Arturo de Córdova – (Mexico)
Thunder Over the Plains, starring Randolph Scott
Titanic, starring Barbara Stanwyck, Clifton Webb, Thelma Ritter, Brian Aherne, Robert Wagner
The Titfield Thunderbolt, directed by Charles Crichton, starring Stanley Holloway – (GB)
Tokyo Story (Tōkyō Monogatari), directed by Yasujirō Ozu – (Japan)
Toot, Whistle, Plunk and Boom
Torch Song, starring Joan Crawford
Treasure of the Golden Condor, directed by Delmer Daves, starring Cornel Wilde
Tropic Zone, starring Ronald Reagan
Trouble Along the Way, starring John Wayne
Trouble in Store, starring Norman Wisdom – (GB)
Tumbleweed, starring Audie Murphy
Twice Upon a Time, directed by Emeric Pressburger – (GB)

U
Ugetsu Monogatari, directed by Kenji Mizoguchi – (Japan)

V
The Vanquished (I Vinti), directed by Michelangelo Antonioni – (Italy)
I Vitelloni, directed by Federico Fellini – (France/Italy)

W
The Wages of Fear (Le Salaire de la Peur), directed by Henri-Georges Clouzot, starring Yves Montand – winner of Golden Bear and Palme d'Or awards – (France)
Walking My Baby Back Home, starring Janet Leigh and Donald O'Connor
War Arrow, starring Maureen O'Hara and Jeff Chandler
The War of the Worlds, starring Gene Barry
White Lightning, starring Stanley Clements and Steve Brodie
White Mane (Crin Blanc, Cheval Sauvage) – (France)
White Witch Doctor, starring Robert Mitchum and Susan Hayward
The Wild One, starring Marlon Brando

Y
Young Bess, starring Jean Simmons, Deborah Kerr, Charles Laughton

Serials
Canadian Mounties vs Atomic Invaders, starring Bill Henry
The Great Adventures of Captain Kidd, starring Richard Crane
Jungle Drums of Africa, starring Clayton Moore and Phyllis Coates
The Lost Planet, starring Judd Holdren

Short film series
Mickey Mouse (1928)-(1953)
Looney Tunes (1930–1969)
Terrytoons (1930–1964)
Merrie Melodies (1931–1969)
Popeye (1933–1957)
Donald Duck (1934)-(1956)
The Three Stooges (1934–1959)
Goofy (1939)-(1953)
Tom and Jerry (1940–1958)
Bugs Bunny (1940)-(1962)
Chip and Dale (1943–1956)
Droopy (1943–1958)
Sylvester the Cat (1944–1966)
Yosemite Sam (1945–1963)
Speedy Gonzales (1953–1968)

Births
January 7: John Dugan (actor), American actor
January 8:
Damián Alcázar, Mexican actor
Tonita Castro, Mexican-born American actress (died 2016)
January 11: John Sessions, British actor and comedian (died 2020)
January 27: Richard Bremmer, English actor
January 28: Susan Buckner, American former actress
January 30: Steven Zaillian, director
February 8: Mary Steenburgen, American actress
February 9: Vito Antuofermo, Italian-American actor
February 11: Philip Anglim, actor
February 19: Massimo Troisi, actor (died 1994)
February 21: Christine Ebersole, American actress and singer
March 2: Ezra Swerdlow, film producer (died 2018)
March 4: 
Scott Hicks, director
Agustí Villaronga, Spanish director
March 15: Frances Conroy, American actress
March 16: Isabelle Huppert, French actress
March 24: Louie Anderson, American stand-up comedian and actor (died 2022)
April 6: Patrick Doyle, Scottish film composer
April 13: Harry Waters Jr., American actor and singer
April 16:
Jay O. Sanders, actor
Marshall Teague (actor), American actor
April 18: Rick Moranis, Canadian actor & comedian
April 23: James Russo, American actor
May 9: Amy Hill, American stand-up comedian, actress and voice actress
May 16: Pierce Brosnan, Irish actor
May 21: Nora Aunor, Filipino actress
May 24: Alfred Molina, English actor
May 30: Colm Meaney, Irish actor
June 5: Kathleen Kennedy (producer), American producer
June 7: Colleen Camp, American character actress and producer
June 12: David Thornton (actor), American actor
June 13: Tim Allen, American actor
June 15: Renée Victor, American actress
June 19: Ken Davitian, American character actor and comedian
June 21: Michael Bowen (actor), American actor
June 26:
Robert Davi, American actor, singer, writer and director
Peng Xiaolian, director (died 2019)
July 1: David Gulpilil, Indigenous-Australian actor (died 2021)
July 5: Harish Patel, Indian actor
July 11: Mindy Sterling, actress
July 13: Gil Birmingham, American actor
July 20: Lee Garlington, American actress
August 7: Lesley Nicol (actress), English actress
August 9: Alf Humphreys, Canadian actor (died 2018)
August 11: Hulk Hogan, wrestler
August 12: Selina Cadell, English actress
August 13: Victor Colicchio, American actor, screenwriter, musician and songwriter
August 14: James Horner, composer (died 2015)
August 18: Sergio Castellitto, Italian actor, director and screenwriter
August 27: Peter Stormare, Swedish actor
August 28: Dee Dee Rescher, American actress
August 30: Robin Harris, American comedian and actor (died 1990)
September 6: Anne Lockhart (actress), American actress
September 10: Amy Irving, actress
September 16: Kurt Fuller, American character actor
September 18: Anna Thomson, American actress
October 4:
Christopher Fairbank, English actor
Tchéky Karyo, French actor
October 9: Tony Shalhoub, actor
October 11:
David Morse, American actor, singer, director and writer
Bill Randolph, American actor
October 12: David Threlfall, English actor and director
October 15: Larry Miller, American comedian, actor, news podcaster and columnist
October 20: Bill Nunn, American actor (died 2016)
October 26: Maureen Teefy, actress
October 27: Peter Firth, English actor
October 30: Charles Martin Smith, American actor, writer and director
October 31: Michael J. Anderson, actor
November 3: Kate Capshaw, American actress
November 6: Ron Underwood, director
November 13: Tom Villard, American actor (died 1993)
November 20: Bembol Roco, Filipino actor
November 24: Glenn Withrow, American actor, director, producer and writer
November 27: Curtis Armstrong, American actor and singer
November 28: Pamela Hayden, American actress and voice actress
December 6
Gina Hecht, American actress
Tom Hulce, American actor
December 8
Kim Basinger, American actress
Sam Kinison, stand-up comedian (died 1992)
December 9: John Malkovich, American actor
December 11: Richard Carter, Australian actor and voice-over artist (died 2019)
December 14: Vijay Amritraj, Indian sports commentator and actor
December 17: Bill Pullman, actor
December 18: Melanie Kinnaman, American dancer and actress
December 22: Gregor Fisher, Scottish comedian and actor
December 23: John Callahan, actor (died 2020)
December 24: Timothy Carhart, American actor
December 29: Charlayne Woodard, American playwright and actress
December 31: James Remar, actor

Deaths
January 19: Arthur Hoyt, 78, American actor, Her Private Affair, Goldie Gets Along
February 2: Alan Curtis, 43, American actor, High Sierra, Buck Privates
February 27: Jessie Coles Grayson, 66, African-American contralto and actress, Cass Timberlane
March 5: Herman J. Mankiewicz, 55, American screenwriter, Citizen Kane, The Pride of the Yankees, Dinner at Eight, Man of the World
March 19: Irene Bordoni, 68, Corsican-American actress and singer, Paris, Louisiana Purchase
April 26: Rian James, 53, American screenwriter, 42nd Street, The Housekeeper's Daughter
May 30: Dooley Wilson, 67, American actor, Casablanca, Stormy Weather
June 5: Roland Young, 65, British actor, Topper, Ruggles of Red Gap, The Philadelphia Story, And Then There Were None
June 27: Chris-Pin Martin, 59, American actor, The Gay Caballero, Ride on Vaquero, Robin Hood of Monterey, King of the Bandits
June 30: Vsevolod Pudovkin, Soviet film director (born 1893)
July 3: Irving Reis, 47, American director, The Big Street, All My Sons
August 6
John Reinhardt, Austrian director, Sofia, Chicago Calling
Houseley Stevenson, American actor, Dark Passage, Kidnapped
August 9: Henri Étiévant, French actor, director (born 1870)
September 12: Lewis Stone, American actor (born 1879), Andy Hardy film series, The Prisoner of Zenda, Grand Hotel
October 6: Porter Hall, American actor (born 1888), Double Indemnity, Mr. Smith Goes to Washington, Going My Way, Miracle on 34th Street
October 8: Nigel Bruce, British actor (born 1895), Sherlock Holmes film series, Suspicion, Rebecca, The Rains Came, Treasure Island
October 13: Millard Mitchell, American character actor (born 1903), Singin' in the Rain, Winchester '73, The Gunfighter, The Naked Spur, Twelve O'Clock High
November 29: Sam De Grasse, Canadian actor (born 1875), Robin Hood, Blind Husbands
December 29: Violet MacMillan, American actress (born 1887), The Magic Cloak of Oz, Violet's Dreams

Debuts
Carroll Baker – Easy to Love
Harry Belafonte – Bright Road
Stanley Kubrick (director) – Fear and Desire
Steve McQueen – Girl on the Run
Geraldine Page – Hondo
Anthony Perkins – The Actress
Harry Shearer – Abbott and Costello Go to Mars
Maureen Stapleton – Main Street to Broadway

Notes 

 
Film by year